Old Country Roses is a famous pattern of bone china made by English tableware manufacturer, Royal Albert, a brand of Royal Doulton. It is said to be the best selling pattern of bone china in the world since its creation in 1962.

References

British porcelain
Individual patterns of tableware